Michael Gangyu Kong from the Loughborough University, Loughborough, Leicestershire, UK was named Fellow of the Institute of Electrical and Electronics Engineers (IEEE) in 2012 for contributions to atmospheric pressure glow discharge sources in biology and medicine.

References

Fellow Members of the IEEE
Living people
Year of birth missing (living people)
Place of birth missing (living people)